Morton W. Weir, born July 18, 1934 in Canton, Illinois, is an experimental psychologist and academic. After earning a BA from Knox College and an MA and PhD from the University of Texas at Austin, he joined the Department of Psychology at the University of Illinois at Urbana-Champaign in 1960 and subsequently served in a number of administrative capacities, retiring from the Chancellorship in 1993.

Education 
Weir graduated cum laude from Knox College in 1955 as a pre-medicine major. In 1958, he received an M.A. in experimental psychology from University of Texas at Austin and his Ph.D. a year later in the same field.

Career 
Weir was a professor of psychology at the University of Illinois at Urbana-Champaign for 33 years. In addition, he served there as Head of the Department of Psychology, as Vice Chancellor for Academic Affairs, Vice President for Academic Affairs, Interim Chancellor, and Chancellor. On leave from the University of Illinois, he served as Director of the Center for the Study of Youth Development, Boys Town, Nebraska (1970-80) and after retirement from administration at the University of Illinois, served as Interim President of Knox College (1998-99) and as Senior Foundation Representative, University of Illinois Foundation (1993-2000). His research and scholarship included learning and problem solving with children, behavioral genetics, and social policy. He served on a number of editorial boards of scientific journals; the National Research and Evaluation Advisory Committee, Project Head Start; the Developmental Behavioral Sciences Study Section, National Institutes of Health; Commissioner and President, North Central Association of Colleges and Schools; and on a number of other professional boards and committees. He was awarded an Alumni Achievement Award and an Honorary Doctor of Laws from Knox College; the Reading Recovery Teacher Leader Award; and a Foreign Service Award from the Foreign Ministry of Japan.

References 

Leaders of the University of Illinois
Knox College (Illinois) alumni
Living people
Year of birth missing (living people)